There were several special elections to the United States House of Representatives in 1905 during the 59th United States Congress.  There were no 1905 elections to the 58th United States Congress.

59th Congress 

|-
| 
| James A. Hemenway
|  | Republican
| 
|  | Incumbent member-elect resigned during previous congress.New member elected May 16, 1905. Republican hold.
| nowrap | 

|-
| 
| Elmer Burkett
|  | Republican
| 
|  | Incumbent member-elect resigned March 4, 1905, after being elected to the U.S. Senate.New member elected July 18, 1905. Republican hold.
| nowrap | 

|-
| 
| Alston G. Dayton
|  | Republican
| 1894
|  | Incumbent resigned March 16, 1905, after being appointed judge for the United States District Court for the Northern District of West Virginia.New member elected June 6, 1905.Democratic gain.
| nowrap | 

|-
| 
| John M. Pinckney
|  | Democratic
| 
|  | Incumbent died April 24, 1905.New member elected June 6, 1905.Democratic hold.
| nowrap | 

|-
| 
| Frank B. Brandegee
|  | Republican
| 
|  | Incumbent resigned May 10, 1905, after being elected to the U.S. Senate.New member elected October 2, 1905.Republican hold.
| nowrap | 

|-
| 
| Benjamin F. Marsh
|  | Republican
| 
|  | Incumbent died June 2, 1905.New member elected November 7, 1905.Republican hold. 
| nowrap | 

|}

 
1905